All Gas No Brakes is an American YouTube channel originally created and previously hosted by independent journalist Andrew Callaghan, based on the book of the same name by Callaghan. The channel has 1.7 million subscribers and over 71 million views . The channel features Callaghan traveling around the United States conducting vox pop interviews at various events, such as conventions and music festivals. The interviews are noted for their surreal and humorous viewpoints on serious topics. Nic Mosher and Evan Gilbert-Katz worked on the channel providing camera, audio, editing, and production management. The show ran from September 9, 2019 to November 12, 2020.

On March 9, 2021, Callaghan announced his departure from the show along with his crew consisting of Mosher and Gilbert-Katz. Therefore, the show ended after one season with the final episode airing on November 12, 2020. He cited contract issues by network Doing Things Media as the reason for his departure, claiming exploitative behavior. The team later moved to a new YouTube channel, which was a spinoff show named Channel 5, which started on April 11, 2021.

History

The idea for All Gas No Brakes was conceived during the summer after high school in which Callaghan hitchhiked across the United States before beginning his journalism studies at Loyola University New Orleans. Callaghan then wrote and self published a book based on his experience hitchhiking and the people he met along the way, titled All Gas No Brakes. Callaghan was a contributing writer for the Loyola school newspaper The Maroon. While in school, Callaghan began doing man-on-the-street interviews along Bourbon Street. The videos, which were uploaded to YouTube and Instagram under the name "Quarter Confessions" led to a partnership between Callaghan and Doing Things Media.

In early 2020, Callaghan started an All Gas No Brakes podcast, in response to travel restrictions stemming from the COVID-19 pandemic. On the podcast, Callaghan interviews past subjects from All Gas No Brakes over video chat.

In March 2021, Callaghan announced via social media that he, along with his team, are no longer involved with production of All Gas No Brakes, as well as its television series currently being produced. He cited contract issues as the reason for their departure.

In a piece by the New York Times on March 23, 2021, videographer Nate Kahn, who worked on All Gas No Brakes for a time, detailed his understanding of Callaghan's dismissal from the company after an attempt to renegotiate his contract. Doing Things Media had become increasingly uncomfortable with the political leanings of the show, specifically an episode focusing on the George Floyd protests in Minneapolis. Callaghan and his crew were later locked out of social media accounts and fired in early March 2021.

Television series
In May 2020, Doing Things Media and Abso Lutely Productions entered a deal to develop a television series based on the channel. According to Callaghan, the partnership began when Abso Lutely co-founder Eric Wareheim privately messaged him on Twitter to ask about the prospects of creating a television series. Wareheim, Tim Heidecker, and Dave Kneebone would serve as executive producers for Abso Lutely, while Callaghan, Reid Hailey, and Max Benator will serve as executive producers for Doing Things Media. Tim Heidecker confirmed on Twitter that Doing Things Media is no longer involved in the production and that Callaghan is still working with them on "something major".

Style and influences
The channel originally featured Callaghan as he interviewed people at various events across the United States, such as the George Floyd protests in Minneapolis–Saint Paul. The people Callaghan interviewed tend to be members of fringe subcultures such as furries, flat earthers, and others that he says represent "true Americana". Callaghan would usually appear dressed in an oversized beige suit and tie, citing this inspiration from television news anchors and how they dressed. Callaghan would appear without the suit in more “serious” themed episodes as a way to let the viewer know that the video would not be intentionally humorous, but rather bring attention to the topic at hand. As a man-on-the-street interviewer, Callaghan's interviews were largely unplanned and improvised. As a result, he has been compared to Louis Theroux, Eric Andre, and Sacha Baron Cohen. Callaghan has also cited Kyle Mooney, Michael Moore, and The Daily Show correspondents as influences.

Episodes

Notes

References

External links
 
 

English-language YouTube channels
YouTube channels launched in 2019